Rodericko Cesar Escueta Racela, also known as Olsen Racela, (born November 1, 1970) is a Filipino coach who previously served as the head coach of the FEU Tamaraws men's basketball team. He is also currently an assistant coach of the Barangay Ginebra San Miguel of the Philippine Basketball Association (PBA). He is a retired PBA player and is considered to be one of the best point guards who ever played in the league. He was also a notable member of the Philippine national basketball team on many occasions.

Early life
Olsen Racela, born on November 1 in Quezon City, Philippines, was so named because he was born on All Saint's Day (his brother Nash was born on Bonifacio Day). As a young boy, he started playing basketball early in his life. It was just a simple game for Olsen back then, which consisted of a couple of shots through a hoop in his old neighborhood. Among his brothers, he proved to have the prodigious basketball skills which gave him a spot in Ateneo de Manila University's varsity team.

Amateur career
Racela played for the Ateneo Blue Eagles in a backup role to Jun Reyes and was a member of the Blue Eagles team that won the UAAP title in 1988. He also played in the Philippine Amateur Basketball League and the RP Youth Team.

PBA career

Purefoods
In 1993, Racela was selected 12th by Purefoods in the 1993 PBA Rookie Draft. From 1993-1996, he played the backup role to Dindo Pumaren and won two titles with the Purefoods franchise under a limited role with the team.

San Miguel Beermen
In 1997, Racela was traded to the San Miguel Beermen for merely two second round picks for the succeeding three years beginning 1998. This became the turnaround of his young career. Under new San Miguel head coach Ron Jacobs, Racela's skills were noticed under a rebuilding Beermen squad of Nelson Asaytono, Freddie Abuda and Mike Mustre.

In 1998, Racela's game would improve and was rewarded with a spot on the Tim Cone-coached Philippine Centennial Team that took home a bronze medal in the 1998 Asian Games in Bangkok, Thailand. A season later, with Racela as its top point guard, San Miguel became the league's new dynasty under Jong Uichico, winning five titles from 1999-2001.

2002 Busan Asiad
He made his second stint in the national team in 2002 for the Asian Games in Busan, South Korea. With Racela as point guard, the Nationals made it all the way through the semifinals against host South Korea. In the final minute, Racela scored a three-pointer to give the Philippines the lead. However, after recovering the possession and was fouled, he missed two crucial free throws that could have given the country a four-point lead. Instead, Lee Sang Min's buzzer-beating triple gave the Koreans a dramatic 69-68 victory. Some argued that the blame rested on Jong Uichico's coaching strategy in which he did not set up a plan to ease Racela's pressure from the 15 foot line.

Despite the missed free-throws, Racela continued to shine in his point guard duties with San Miguel. In 2004, he dished his 2,000th career assist and was the starting point guard when the Beermen won another title in the 2005 PBA Fiesta Conference.

Starting in the 2007-08 All Filipino Conference, Racela occasionally played off the bench in preparation for his retirement and later life as an assistant coach.

On August 11, 2010, Racela became the fifth player alongside Ramon Fernandez, Robert Jaworski, Abet Guidaben & Philip Cezar to play at least 900 games in the PBA.

League's oldest active Player and Retirement 
After PBA legend Johnny Abarrientos announced his retirement, Racela played for another season with San Miguel. He turned 40 on November 1, 2010 and was the senior statesman of the PBA during that season. He announced his retirement on January 28, 2011 at the Araneta Coliseum at the start of Game 4 of the finals. He had played the entire finals series before he hanged up his #17 jersey in which Talk 'N Text Tropang Texters subdued San Miguel Beermen in 6 games.

Coaching career
On December 20, 2016, FEU announced the hiring of Racela as the head coach of the FEU Tamaraws men's basketball team in the UAAP. He replaced his brother Nash, who was appointed as the head coach of the PBA team TNT Katropa. This also serves as his first head coaching job in a varsity basketball team.

Coaching record

Collegiate record

PBA

Personal life
Racela's nickname was based on the day of his birth as it was during All-Saints Day.

His brother, Raoul Cesar or Nash Racela, is currently the head coach of the Adamson Soaring Falcons and the former head coach of the FEU Tamaraws who were champions in the UAAP. Nash also coached the Batangas Blades in the Metropolitan Basketball Association. Olsen has 3 children namely Ryan, Raya, and Rafa.

Basketball career

School leagues
1984: Ateneo de Manila - PAYA Aspirants
1985: Ateneo de Manila - PAYA Juniors
1986 Ateneo de Manila - UAAP Juniors
1987-1992: Ateneo de Manila - UAAP Seniors

Philippine Basketball League
1989: Crispa Redmanizers
1990-1991: A&W Rootbeers
1992: Pop Cola

Philippine Basketball Association
 1993–1996: Purefoods Tender Juicy Hotdogs
 1997–2011: San Miguel Beermen

National teams
1987 Asian Youth 18 years and below, Qatar
1989 ABC Under-18 Championship, Manila
1998 Asian Games, Thailand
1998 Jones Cup, Taipei
2002 Asian Games, Busan, South Korea

Awards and achievements

Philippine Basketball Association
 1993 Mr. Quality Minutes
 1998-1999 2-time Mythical Second Team
 2000-2001 2-time Mythical First Team
 2000-01, 2003–04, 2006 5-time All-Star
 2002-2003 Mythical Second team
 2004 21st member of 2000-Assist Club
 2010 5th member of 900 Games club

PBA career statistics

Season-by-season averages

|-
| align="left" | 1993
| align="left" | Coney Island/Purefoods
| 43 || 8.3 || .514 || .333 || .700 || 0.9 || 1.3 || .4 || .1 || 3.4
|-
| align="left" | 1994
| align="left" | Coney Island/Purefoods
| 62 || 15.6 || .479 || .444 || .661 || 0.9 || 1.5 || .4 || .1 || 3.7
|-
| align="left" | 1995
| align="left" | Purefoods
| 59 || 24.8 || .502 || .222 || .851 || 1.7 || 3.1 || 1.2 || .1 || 6.7
|-
| align="left" | 1996
| align="left" | Purefoods TJ/Corned Beef
| 58 || 22.6 || .454 || .115 || .795 || 1.5 || 3.0 || .8 || .1 || 6.4
|-
| align="left" | 1997
| align="left" | San Miguel
| 62 || 40.0 || .439 || .316 || .876 || 1.8 || 4.7 || .7 || .1 || 11.4
|-
| align="left" | 1998
| align="left" | San Miguel
| 49 || 38.2 || .455 || .292 || .847 || 2.8 || 4.5 || 1.1 || .2 || 8.8
|-
| align="left" | 1999
| align="left" | San Miguel
| 53 || 34.2 || .399 || .233 || .843 || 2.3 || 3.6 || .8 || .1 || 7.3
|-
| align="left" | 2000
| align="left" | San Miguel
| 58 || 32.9 || .461 || .383 || .839 || 2.3 || 3.0 || .6 || .1 || 9.6
|-
| align="left" | 2001
| align="left" | San Miguel
| 70 || 34.3 || .395 || .381 || .871 || 2.2 || 2.8 || .8 || .03 || 10.9
|-
| align="left" | 2002
| align="left" | San Miguel
| 12 || 26.2 || .384 || .294 || .800 || 1.9 || 4.6 || .9 || .2 || 9.7
|-
| align="left" | 2003
| align="left" | San Miguel
| 50 || 32.5 || .417 || .373 || .865 || 3.0 || 4.8 || 1.1 || .1 || 10.8
|-
| align="left" | 2004–05
| align="left" | San Miguel
| 78 || 34.0 || .398 || .354 || .827 || 2.2 || 5.3 || 1.1 || .1 || 11.4
|-
| align="left" | 2005-06
| align="left" | San Miguel
| 43 || 32.6 || .367 || .305 || .863 || 2.7 || 4.3 || 1.1 || .1 || 8.3
|-
| align="left" | 2006-07
| align="left" | San Miguel
| 62 || 26.3 || .373  || .286 || .872 || 2.3 || 3.5 || 1.0 || .1 || 8.5
|-
| align="left" | 2007-08
| align="left" | Magnolia
| 47 || 20.0 || .426 || .391 || .912 || 1.6 || 2.5 || .6 || .1 || 6.3
|-
| align="left" | 2008-09
| align="left" | San Miguel
| 56 || 20.0 || .387 || .327 || .828 || 1.9 || 3.2 || .6 || .04 || 6.0
|-
| align="left" | 2009-10
| align="left" | San Miguel
| 39 || 11.0 || .393 || .328 || .833 || 0.8 || 1.2 || .6 || .03 || 3.2
|-
| align="left" | 2010-11
| align="left" | San Miguel
| 24 || 12.0 || .344 || .303 || .875 || 0.8 || 1.7 || .3 || .0 || 3.0
|-
| align="left" | Career
| align="left" |
| 925 || 27.0 || .419 || .334 || .841 || 1.9 || 3.3 || .8 || .1 || 7.8

References

1970 births
Living people
Asian Games bronze medalists for the Philippines
Asian Games medalists in basketball
Basketball players at the 1998 Asian Games
Basketball players at the 2002 Asian Games
Filipino men's basketball coaches
Filipino men's basketball players
Filipino Roman Catholics
Filipino television sportscasters
Magnolia Hotshots players
Philippine Basketball Association All-Stars
San Miguel Beermen coaches
Philippine Basketball Association players with retired numbers
Philippines men's national basketball team players
Point guards
San Miguel Beermen players
Basketball players from Quezon City
Ateneo Blue Eagles men's basketball players
Medalists at the 1998 Asian Games
Magnolia Hotshots draft picks
Magnolia Hotshots coaches
Barangay Ginebra San Miguel coaches
FEU Tamaraws basketball coaches